TD Arena is a 5,100 seat multi-purpose arena in Charleston, South Carolina, United States that opened in 2008 and replaced John Kresse Arena as the home of the College of Charleston Cougars basketball and volleyball teams.  The South Financial Group of Greenville purchased the naming rights to the new facility and it opened in 2008 under the Carolina First Arena name.  After the 2010 sale of the corporation to Toronto Dominion Bank, the arena's name changed to TD Arena.  The playing surface is named John Kresse Court in honor of legendary Charleston men's basketball coach John Kresse.

Originally to be named Carolina First Center, the facility was renamed Carolina First Arena to avoid confusion with the bank's south coast main offices in Charleston which are located in an office building by the same name.

The first game played at the arena on November 14, 2008 was a first round game of the inaugural ESPN Charleston Classic between Texas Christian University and Western Michigan University won by TCU 67-63.

Perhaps the biggest game in arena history was an 82-79 Charleston victory in overtime over then-No. 9 ranked and defending national champion North Carolina on January 4, 2010.

The arena not only plays host to Cougars' basketball games, but it also hosts many other campus events, including orientations, campus tours, award ceremonies, and external events (including concerts for Hootie & Spoleto Festival). The TD Arena is overseen by Richard Bouknight, Director of Operations. He is assisted by Nate Place, Assistant Director of Operations.

See also
List of NCAA Division I basketball arenas
TD Garden (Boston, Massachusetts)
TD Bank Ballpark (Bridgewater, New Jersey)
TD Ameritrade Park Omaha (Nebraska)
TD Bank Sports Center (Hamden, Connecticut)

References

External links
TD Arena

College of Charleston Cougars basketball
College basketball venues in the United States
Basketball venues in South Carolina
Sports venues in Charleston, South Carolina
2008 establishments in South Carolina
Sports venues completed in 2008
College volleyball venues in the United States